Liam Hill (born 5 October 1993 in Melbourne) is an Australian cyclist riding for Kenyan Riders Downunder.

References

Australian male cyclists
1993 births
Living people
Cyclists from Melbourne